This is a list of fictional Jews, characters from any work of fiction whose Jewish identity has been noted as a key component of the story or who have been identified impacting or reflecting cultural views about Jewish people.

References

 
Fictitious
Jews
Jewish portrayals in media